Carlo de' Medici (19 March 1595 – 17 June 1666) was the son of Ferdinando I de' Medici, Grand Duke of Tuscany and Christina of Lorraine.

Biography

Born in Florence, he had a successful career in the Church, rising to become Cardinal Bishop of Ostia and Dean of the College of Cardinals.
De' Medici was raised to the cardinalate by Pope Paul V in the consistory of 2 December 1615 and was made Cardinal Deacon of Santa Maria in Domnica. He was an elector at the papal conclaves of 1621 and 1623 that elected Pope Gregory XV and Pope Urban VIII. He transferred deaconries to that of San Nicola in Carcere in 1623, and was the Cardinal protodeacon at the conclave of 1644 that elected Pope Innocent X. He was briefly Cardinal Deacon of Sant'Eustachio, before being raised to the order of Cardinal Priests in December 1644, with the title of San Sisto.

The next year, de' Medici was raised to Cardinal Bishop of Sabina, but opted for the suburbicarian see of Frascati seven months later. On 29 April 1652 he was made Cardinal Bishop of Porto e Santa Rufina and Vice-Dean of the College of Cardinals. On 23 September the same year he became Dean of the College of Cardinals and Cardinal Bishop of Ostia e Velletri. He presided over the conclave of 1655 and announced the papal election of Pope Alexander VII.

Carlo de' Medici died in Florence in 1666. He is buried at his family crypt at the Basilica di San Lorenzo di Firenze.

References

1595 births
1666 deaths
Nobility from Florence
Deans of the College of Cardinals
17th-century Italian cardinals
Cardinal-bishops of Frascati
Cardinal-bishops of Ostia
Cardinal-bishops of Porto
Cardinal-bishops of Sabina
Carlo
Protodeacons
17th-century Italian Roman Catholic bishops
Burials at San Lorenzo, Florence
Clergy from Florence
Sons of monarchs